The 1980 Speedway World Team Cup was the 21st edition of the FIM Speedway World Team Cup to determine the team world champions.

The final took place at the Vojens Speedway Center in Denmark. England won their eighth title to extend their record and the United States had their best performance to date finishing second. The defending champions New Zealand finished last in the British qualifying round.

Qualification

Round 1
 May 18
  King's Lynn, Norfolk Arena
 Referee:  G Bergstrom

* England & USA to Intercontinental Final

Round 2
 June 11
  Kumla, Kumla Speedway

* Denmark & Sweden to Intercontinental Final

Round 3
 May 18
  Castiglione Olona

* Soviet Union & Italy to Continental Semi-Final

Round 4
 May 17
  Krumbach, Bavaria

* West Germany & Netherlands to Continental Semi-Final

Tournament

Continental Semifinal
 June 29
  Rodenbach, Rhineland-Palatinate

* West Germany & Soviet Union to Continental Final

Continental Final
 July 13
  Bremen
 Referee:  Mr. Kristensen

* Poland & Czechoslovakia to World Final

Intercontinental Final
 July 5
  Vojens, Speedway Center
 Att: 8,000

* England & USA to World Final

World Final
 September 21
  Wrocław, Olympic Stadium
 Att: 55,000

See also
 1980 Individual Speedway World Championship
 1980 Speedway World Pairs Championship

References

1980
World T